Mnemozina was a quarterly literary almanac, published in Moscow from 1824 to 1825. The full title in the Russian language is Мнемозина, собрание сочинений в стихах и прозе (Mnemozina, collected works in verse and prose) and was a reference to Mnemosyne, a persona in Greek mythology embodying memory. The main editors were Wilhelm Küchelbecker, and Vladimir Odoevsky.

History
Mnemozina came about as a production of the Lovers of Wisdom society, a literary and philosophical circle created by Odoevsky and Dmitry Venevitinov in the early 1820s. Besides Odoevsky, Venevitinov and Küchelbecker, the Society counted Aleksey Khomyakov, Mikhail Pogodin and others as members.

Alexander Pushkin, who was attracted to Mnemozina through his friends Küchelbecker and Venevitinov, was an admirer of the magazine's publications. Pushkin contributed his poem The Demon to Mnemozina.

Mnemozina was devoted to the consideration and debate of the ideas of the French Encyclopédistes of the eighteenth century, and to the spread of German idealism.

The direct successor to Mnemozina was The Russian Messenger.

References

1824 establishments in the Russian Empire
Defunct literary magazines published in Europe
Defunct magazines published in Russia
Defunct political magazines
Magazines established in 1824
Magazines disestablished in 1825
Magazines published in Moscow
Russian-language magazines
Literary magazines published in Russia
Quarterly magazines published in Russia